Finnish Commuter Airlines Oy, trading as Finncomm Airlines, was a regional airline with its head office on the grounds of Seinäjoki Airport in Ilmajoki, Finland, near Seinäjoki. The carrier operated flights to Estonia, Germany, Lithuania, Romania, Sweden and 16 destinations within Finland from its base at Helsinki Airport. The airline was a member of the European Regions Airline Association. Finncomm Airlines was the largest domestic air carrier in Finland in terms of number of flights.

The company was replaced by Flybe Nordic in 2011 and was rebranded as Nordic Regional Airlines in May 2015.

History 

In 1993, Juhani Pakari and his father started Finncomm Airlines as an Air Taxi business flying light aircraft to remote airstrips which other carriers did not serve. Seeking to acquire an Air Operator's Certificate (AOC) to begin scheduled flights, Finncomm partnered with Swedish carrier Golden Air in 1999 until Finncomm could receive their own AOC.  The original Golden Air fleet consisted of seven Saab 340s and one Saab 2000.

In September 2003, Finncomm received their own AOC and operations began with one Embraer ERJ-145s leased from Swiss International Air Lines. Inaugural services between Helsinki and Stuttgart were followed by flights to Düsseldorf and Oslo with the arrival of a second ERJ-145 from Swiss International Air Lines in April 2005.

At the 2005 Paris Air Show, Finncomm announced a $250 million contract for eight ATR-42-500 aircraft with options for a further eight. With the arrival of the ATR-42 in late November 2005, the airline could begin to retire the Saab fleet inherited from Golden Air.

In 2006, at the Farnborough Air Show, Finncomm signed a contract which converted four of their ATR-42 orders to the larger ATR-72-500. This was further supplemented by the purchase of an additional three ATR-72 aircraft at a list price of $54 million.

In January 2008 the carrier announced another order for a further five ATR-72-500 aircraft with deliveries between 2009 and 2011. Once all the orders have been fulfilled by ATR, Finncomm will become the largest operator of the ATR-500 series in Europe.

On 9 September 2010, Finnair Group announced that they had signed a preliminary agreement to acquire all the aircraft from Finnish Commuter Airlines Oy and 20% of Finncomm Airlines Oy for the total sum of €48 million. On 1 July 2011, Finnair and Flybe announced they were to jointly buy Finncomm for €25 million. The company was renamed Flybe Nordic. 60% of shares were owned by Flybe while Finnair  owned 40%.

Operations

Finncomm employed over 250 staff and in 2008 the carrier flew 870,000 passengers, an increase of 45% over the previous year despite a tough economic climate. The growth allowed an operating profit of over €9.4 million which was a 9.8% increase over 2007. The airline expected to carry over 1,000,000 passengers in 2009.

Finncomm co-operated with Finnair to provide feeder traffic for Finnair's international route network.

The Finnish Civil Aviation Authority (FCAA) ordered some changes to Finncomm's operating procedures and temporarily increased their weather minimums in ATR operations following an incident in late 2006. The incident was investigated and some re-training was ordered by FCAA for pilots regarding new operating procedures. Weather restrictions were lifted and normal operations resumed.

Destinations 
Finncomm Airlines operated the following services (as of June 2011):

Estonia
Tallinn – Lennart Meri Tallinn Airport
Finland
Enontekiö – Enontekiö Airport [seasonal]
Helsinki – Helsinki Airport base
Joensuu – Joensuu Airport
Jyväskylä – Jyväskylä Airport
Kajaani – Kajaani Airport
Kemi/Tornio – Kemi-Tornio Airport
Kittilä – Kittilä Airport [seasonal]
Kokkola/Jakobstad – Kruunupyy Airport
Kuopio – Kuopio Airport
Kuusamo – Kuusamo Airport [seasonal]
Oulu – Oulu Airport
Pori – Pori Airport
Savonlinna – Savonlinna Airport
Seinäjoki – Seinäjoki Airport
Tampere – Tampere-Pirkkala Airport
Turku – Turku Airport
Vaasa – Vaasa Airport
Varkaus – Varkaus Airport
Germany
Stuttgart – Stuttgart Airport
Latvia
Riga – Riga Airport
Poland
Gdańsk – Gdańsk Lech Wałęsa Airport
Romania
Bucharest – Henri Coandă International Airport
Sweden
Norrköping – Norrköping Airport
Skellefteå – Skellefteå Airport

Fleet 
The Finncomm Airlines fleet included the following aircraft (as of 13 May 2011):

Finncomm announced plans to possess 16 ATR-500 series aircraft by the end of 2011, suggesting they planned to convert at least 3 of their options into firm orders.

Environment 
Finncomm Airlines mitigated its environmental impact. The carrier utilised a very modern and fuel efficient fleet of ATRs and Embraers which reduced fuel burn and noise. Furthermore, when aircraft were at an airport overnight, they were placed in heated hangars to reduce the amount of de-icing agent used on the aircraft. Finncomm stated that saved 300,000 litres of anti-ice solvents annually.

References

External links

Finncomm Airlines Fleet
Finnish aviation authority curbs Finncomm turboprop pilots' rights (2007)

1993 establishments in Finland
2011 disestablishments in Finland
Airlines established in 1993
Airlines disestablished in 2011
Defunct airlines of Finland
European Regions Airline Association

ja:フィンコム航空